Hoffman is an unincorporated community in Johnson County, in the U.S. state of Missouri.

History
A post office called Hoffman was established in 1892, and remained in operation until 1904. The community was named after George Hoffman, the original owner of the town site.

References

Unincorporated communities in Johnson County, Missouri
Unincorporated communities in Missouri